The following is a list of the characters appearing on the television show Mama's Family (1983–1990) and The Family (1974–1978) sketches on The Carol Burnett Show which preceded it.

Thelma Harper (Mama)
See Thelma Harper

Eunice Harper Higgins
See Eunice Harper Higgins

Vinton Harper

Vinton Ray Harper, played by Ken Berry, was the youngest child of Thelma Harper and her late husband, Carl. Vint was born on April 23. As a child and adult, he was often at the mercy of his older sisters, snobbish and selfish Ellen and temperamental, tempestuous Eunice.

Vint worked as a locksmith at a store called Kwik Keys. Prior to the series run, Vint and his former wife, Mitzi, had two children, Vinton "Buzz" Harper Jr. and Sonja Harper. Mitzi had just abandoned Vinton and her family to move to Las Vegas as the series began, finding work there as a cocktail waitress, and Vint and his two children moved in with his mother after being evicted from their house.  He soon reconnected with former schoolmate, and his mother's next-door neighbor, Naomi Oates. They fell in love after a one-night stand, exacerbating the neighborly rivalry between Thelma and Naomi, and they married in his mother's house. Their plan after marriage had been to move to Arizona to run a trailer park, but their business partner absconded with their money, leaving them destitute with no other alternative but to move into his mother's basement.

During the NBC run of the series (1983-1984), Vint was portrayed as clumsy, temperamental and unafraid of confrontation. As a blue-collar worker from the heartland, a few episodes during the NBC run revolved around his family's inability to act with grace and class in public, much to the embarrassment of the more cultured members of the family. This changed during the series run in syndication (1986-1990), when Vint was portrayed as dumbfounded and naïve, with a peaceable demeanor and fear of confrontation.

Toward the end of the third season, Vint became a member of the Mystic Knights of the Cobras, a fictitious men's order similar to the Shriners and the Elks Club.

A running gag throughout the series was that the Vint and Naomi characters were relegated to living in his mother's basement while other family members occupied the rooms upstairs. When the series began running in syndication in 1986, Vint's children Buzz, and Sonja had moved out of the house and his aunt (Thelma's sister Fran) had recently died. The season three premiere had Vint's nephew Bubba Higgins, the son of Eunice and Ed Higgins, released from juvenile hall to Thelma's custody after his parents had left Raytown for Florida; Bubba was given Fran's spacious room, complete with pink floral wallpaper. A season four episode addressed the unusual living arrangements between the family members as they switched rooms, but Vint and his wife ultimately chose to move back into the basement and remained there without further complaint. In the penultimate episode of the series, Vint and Naomi finally moved out of the basement and into a recreational vehicle parked in his mother's driveway.

A recurring theme throughout the fifth season had Vint and his wife planning and attempting to conceive a child, culminating in the announcement during the season finale that Naomi was pregnant. The sixth season partly focused on the family's preparation for the baby's birth, and the series ended with Naomi giving birth to a daughter, Tiffany Thelma Harper.

Naomi Harper

Naomi Harper (formerly Oates), played by actress-director Dorothy Lyman, was the second wife of Vinton Harper and the bane of Thelma Harper's existence. Thelma thinks that Naomi is a floozy; but Vint adores her and calls her "Skeeter". At first, Naomi was Thelma's neighbor, always complaining about the sap from Thelma's tree dripping on her car, but later she becomes family. Naomi is a very amorous, touchy-feely woman, who's often seen openly showing her love and affection towards Vint by rubbing and feeling all over him. She almost always either wears the color yellow and/or off-the-shoulder dresses and blouses.

She met Vint, an old schoolmate, after he moved in with his mother, and the two hit it off. They even shared a night together, which infuriated Thelma.

In fact, her wedding ceremony was almost ruined by the over-the-top antics of her hateful sister-in-law, Eunice Harper Higgins. Eunice begged both Vint and Naomi to let her sing. Naomi reluctantly agreed, basically to keep Eunice quiet. However, the straw broke for Eunice when Naomi showed her a ring that her mother had given Vint. It turned out to be a sapphire ring that had belonged to her father, which she had coveted for some time. Naomi tied the ring around her neck (it was the something old, something borrowed and something blue, her dress was the something new).

This led to Eunice going off on every single member of her family, particularly her mother, leading her long-suffering husband Ed to carry her out of the house. Naomi wasn't spared Eunice's tongue-lashing during this argument, and neither was Vinton; she called her younger brother "Tinker Bell" and referred to Naomi as a "recycled bride". This set the stage for animosity between Eunice and Naomi.

At first, Naomi, with Vint and her new family, was set to move to Arizona to run a trailer park, but her so-called "partner" ran off with the money she had made selling her house.

Naomi worked as a cashier at Food Circus, a local grocery store in Raytown, and continued to do so after her marriage. She later was promoted to Assistant Manager. She worked under three managers, Mr. Frank Palmer (who hired Thelma Harper as head of customer relations), Mr. Carruthers, and Mr. Archie Woods, who sexually harassed Naomi.

She had been married two previous times, most notably to Leonard Oates (played by Jerry Reed), but despite that, Vint is her soul-mate and the love of her life. She and Vint remain a solid couple, even though neighbor Iola Boylen makes no secret of her lifelong crush on Vint.

Although she established a bond with her two stepchildren (from Vint's first marriage), Vinton "Buzz" Harper, Jr. and Sonja Harper, she had her own child by Vint, Tiffany Thelma Harper, who was named in part after her grandmother. After years of living in the basement of the Harper home, they purchased a trailer and lived in the backyard, out of the house, but never out of Thelma's shadow.

Naomi's character underwent a change after the series went to first-run syndication; she became dumber and less assertive. During the run on NBC, Naomi was not shown to be a pushover and quite often stood up to Mama; at one point she even sued her. This side of Naomi was dropped when the series entered syndication.

There is also a continuity error with how many prior times Naomi has been married. Most say Vinton was her third husband, but in several instances (such as in the episode regarding the chili cook-off), Naomi names four prior ex-husbands, which would make Vinton her fifth. Naomi says she married Tommy Lee when she was 17, then names Rick, Leonard, and George as her other husbands. It was Leonard (played by Jerry Reed) who had the last name of Oates.

Naomi boasts about her cooking, but it's really canned food with a few added ingredients. Her "Famous International Stew" is canned stew, canned peas, canned Mexican corn, canned sauerkraut and SpaghettiOs. Another time is when Mama, Iola and Naomi competed in a chili cookoff, Naomi's ingredients consisted of canned chili, Beer Nuts, beef jerky, and Fritos. Despite having limited cooking skills, Naomi briefly worked as a caterer with disastrous results.

Vinton "Buzz" Harper Jr.
When Mitzi ran off to Las Vegas to work as a cocktail waitress) he, his father, and his sister Sonja Harper moved in with his grandmother, Thelma Harper, after they were evicted from their house. He maintained good relationship with his grandmother and great-aunt Fran Crowley because he didn't constantly drive his grandmother crazy as Sonja would do and as his father did to his mother when he was Buzz's age. Aunt Fran favored him because they shared a bathroom, and he was much neater and more orderly than Sonja. He was extremely obedient, patient, and perpetually willing to do the right thing. Although he could be as headstrong as anyone else in the family, he was never outright mean. This didn't please Sonja; like her aunts before her, she felt that he was overshadowing her.

Buzz also seemed to have a close bond with his grandmother. One example was when she was lining up help to clean the attic. After everyone else gave some ridiculous and even not-so-subtle excuses, Buzz said that he had no excuse and therefore would help her. "You've got no imagination, Buzz" his grandmother said, "but I love you." The two shared stories from her earlier days when his dad and aunts were children, and although they never got the attic (where Buzz slept) cleaned up, both enjoyed the day. As it turned out, it was a surprise for Thelma, who received a long-coveted freezer as a birthday gift, and everyone had pitched in.

Another sore spot with Sonja was that although she was older, she perceived Buzz to be favored by his father. In fact, he told his father, after he had told them that he was planning to remarry, that no matter what situations he dragged them into, they were his for the dragging. In his mind, other fathers would have given up on them and dumped them, but his father never did, and that was good enough for him.

Buzz and Sonja were on the receiving end of their sharp-tongued aunt Eunice Harper Higgins's ire when she told them to "go soak their heads in Clearasil!!" at Vint and Naomi's wedding.

After two years of living with their grandmother, Buzz and Sonja moved to an unknown location and did not appear in the syndicated episodes. The only mention of Buzz and Sonja was in the first syndicated episode, when Thelma lamented that they could not attend Fran's funeral. They did establish a bond with their father's second wife, Naomi Harper. Buzz outright said that he liked her.

Sonja Harper
Sonja Harper is a fictional character in the American television sitcom Mama's Family.  She was played by Karin Argoud.

Sonja was the teenage daughter of Vinton Harper and his first wife Mitzi. In typical teenage fashion, she often appeared bored. She was older, but she chafed when she realized that she was often overlooked by her younger, and more-readily-obedient brother Vinton "Buzz" Harper, Jr.

Also, like her aunts, Ellen Harper and Eunice Harper Higgins, she had some resentment towards Buzz. He always seemed to do the right thing, while she always messed up.  She was older and got an earlier curfew.

She mostly acts like she was bored, and is considered a slacker, but she clearly does love her family.  She often drives her grandmother Thelma Harper crazy, much like her aunts did when they were her age. Needing to share a bathroom with Buzz and their great-aunt Fran Crowley led to more arguments. Sonja was quite sloppy, unlike neat and orderly Buzz (another sore spot), which made the already-nervous Fran even more nervous. Sonja later adopted a classier look and style in her appearance and clothing.

Sonja left Raytown with her brother after two years, to parts unknown.  She, like her brother, formed a bond with her father's second wife, Naomi Harper.

Aunt Effie Harper
Aunt Effie Harper or Effie Crowley was the cousin (in earlier episodes) or sister-in-law (in later seasons) of Thelma Harper. She was played by Dorothy Van, who also wrote several episodes.

She lives on a farm in nearby Ceciltown, is somewhat deaf, and is possibly the sister of Carl Harper. She and Thelma are fairly close, although they once got into a fight when Effie claimed she fell and needed Thelma to stay with her, and it turned out she had fallen three weeks before. She once fell off the roof while she was trying to re-shingle it. She suffered a concussion and fell into a near-catatonic state, worrying Thelma, until a jigsaw puzzle snaps her back to herself.

Ellen Harper

Ellen Jackson (née Mary Ellen Harper), who made sporadic appearances in the sketch comedy, The Family, and its spin-off sitcom, Mama's Family, was played by Betty White.

Ellen was born on June 30 in Raytown and is the oldest of Carl Harper and Thelma Crowley Harper's three children. Even as a child, her snobbish tendencies asserted themselves. Typically, she prefers not to associate with anyone in her family unless it benefits her in some way. She was married to the often-spoken-of but never-seen Bruce Jackson, whom she later divorced. Her ability to do anything well irritated her resentful younger sister Eunice to no end, further fueling the explosive rivalry between the sisters, as Eunice always thought both their parents favored Ellen over her. Ellen later learned of Bruce's infidelity from Eunice, who gleefully exposed it to her face the night before Vint and Naomi's wedding. Ellen's relationship with her brother Vinton "Vint" Harper tends to be amicable, although, like the rest of the family, she usually dismisses him for being a bit dim.

Shortly after her divorce from Bruce Jackson, Ellen began to date a much-younger man named Glenn, to which Thelma vehemently objected ("She's old enough to have lived two of his lives," Thelma observed.) She later began seeing Alvin Tutweiler, mayor of Raytown. Ellen saw him as the ticket back into the high society that she missed since her divorce. When confronted on this conniving by her mother, she flippantly replied: "it worked for Nancy Reagan." Ellen was clearly resentful towards her mother when she decided to run against her boyfriend for mayor. Despite Ellen's conniving, Thelma won the Mayor's race. However, Thelma realized that she couldn't run Raytown, so she relinquished the Mayor's office back to Tutweiler.

When the show went into syndication, it was presumed that Ellen still lived in Raytown as she was frequently mentioned but seen in only one episode after the second season. By this time, Betty White was starring in The Golden Girls.

Despite being her mother's favorite, Ellen (like her siblings) isn't spared Thelma's criticism, insults, or wrath. When Fran died, Ellen not attending her funeral caused a huge rift in Thelma and Ellen's relationship, and Thelma threatened to not speak to her again. Afterwards, Ellen made an attempt to mend fences with her mother by showing up with a peace offering, but Thelma remained unmoved and ordered her out of the house. Thelma let go of her animosity soon after when she learned that Ellen had been checked into the hospital for surgery (in reality, she had a mere fanny tuck). It was there that Thelma admitted to Ellen that she had always favored her over her other two kids. That was Ellen's character's last appearance in the series.

Ellen was chosen as Raytown Country Club's 'Woman of the Year' and was embarrassed when Thelma, Vint, and Naomi showed up at the awards ceremony.

However, in "The Family" sketches on the Carol Burnett Show, Ellen has no qualms about snapping back at her mother, when she is annoyed with her. In those sketches, she was also near-gleeful whenever she got something that Eunice wanted, like a Tiffany lampshade or a box of fine china. She also tended to rub it into Eunice's face that she was favored over Eunice.

In The Family sketches, Ellen's husband's name was initially Arthur and they had two spoiled daughters, Mary Beth and Debbie.

Ed Higgins

Ed Higgins is a character in "The Family" sketches on The Carol Burnett Show and, to a lesser extent, on the sitcom spin-off Mama's Family. In both cases, he was played by Harvey Korman.

Among other things, Ed is a fiercely ill-tempered, slovenly, unsuccessful buffoon in The Family sketches. In his appearances on Mama's Family, however, the intensity of the character is toned down and he is more of an affable, buffoonish dolt. Ed is the owner of Central Hardware store in Raytown. He was married to the most trying of women, Eunice Harper Higgins. They eloped, much against her mother Thelma Harper's wishes, and that set up years of contention. In his wife's eyes, he was an inconsiderate, worthless goon. At the hardware store, he had an assistant named Mickey Hart (Tim Conway). Mickey was only seen on The Carol Burnett Show.

Ed was asked by his brother-in-law's soon-to-be wife Naomi Harper to give her away at her wedding. This earned him the wrath of Eunice, who wanted to sing at the wedding but was turned down by almost everyone in the family. During the wedding, Eunice decided to destroy the festivities, by railing and ranting at every member of her family, because once again, she was overshadowed by them.

However, it is possible Ed has some relief from Eunice in the form of prostitutes. This is indicated during the first season episode "Cellmates," in which Thelma and Eunice are in jail together, with a prostitute who sets them both straight (briefly). When Ed comes to bail the women out, he and the prostitute recognize each other suggestively.

Ed and Eunice had two sons, Bubba and Billy Joe. They ultimately abandoned Bubba while he was in juvenile hall, moving to Florida without telling him. Ed never appeared in any syndicated episodes. Eunice appeared as a child and a teenager in two syndicated episodes, played by different actresses.

Bubba Higgins

Bubba Higgins is a fictional character in the television situation comedy, Mama's Family. He was played by Allan Kayser.

Bubba Higgins was the son of Ed and Eunice Higgins. Some time prior to his first appearance, he had stolen a car, and was sent to juvenile hall.

He was released early on good behavior, only to return home and find that it was locked up. During Fran's wake, Bubba was told that his parents had basically left him in Raytown while they went off to Florida. This characteristically selfish act of Eunice's was enough to incur the wrath of her mother, Thelma Harper, who swore that she would kill Eunice for leaving Bubba in Raytown and also later for missing her own son's high school graduation.

Bubba was quite a contrast from his cousin, Vinton "Buzz" Harper, Jr. Whereas Buzz was patient and easy to get along with, Bubba was a lot like his mother. He wasn't as selfish as she was, but he was temperamental and stubborn. He was also very girl-crazy, something that his grandmother couldn't understand. One time, she found a porno magazine in his bedroom, and she formed MOP (Mothers Opposing Pornography) to quash that.

Bubba's two best friends were Dwayne and T-Boy. Thelma thoroughly disliked the two from the outset, and often forbade Bubba from hanging out with them, but he usually wound up doing so and angering her in the process.

When he first arrived, he didn't win any favor with his uncle Vinton and aunt Naomi Harper, when he got the prized bedroom that was left open when Thelma's sister, Fran Crowley, died. Thelma had indeed promised him his own room. They had wanted that room, and were angered that Bubba got it, promise or no promise. They remained, under protest, in the basement.

Bubba nearly caused a serious breach in his relationship with his grandmother, when he came home drunk on a few beers. It hurt Thelma to see Bubba drunk and it reminded her all too clearly of the first time Eunice drank. During a mother-daughter banquet, where Eunice and Thelma were supposed to sing "MOTHER," they instead got into a violent argument about all the things that her mother had thought she had done and wrecked. That was why Thelma was so strident against drinking. Iola had told Bubba, Vint and Naomi the story the day after Bubba's drinking incident and he tearfully apologized to Thelma, telling her she was the last person in the world he ever wanted to hurt. Thelma happily accepted and Bubba swore off drinking.

Although he regularly drives his family crazy, they truly love Bubba. He got through his probation, and started to attend junior college. By this time, he did break away from Dwayne and T-Boy. He was also instrumental in saving his grandmother's home, when he discovered that the house was a former brothel in which the founder of Raytown had died. This made the house a Raytown historical landmark.

Aunt Fran Crowley

Frances Marie Crowley, commonly known as "Aunt Fran", is a fictional character on the television series, Mama's Family. She was portrayed by Rue McClanahan during the show's first two seasons.

Fran is the uptight spinster younger sister of acid-tongued Thelma Harper. At first, she was the only one living with Thelma, until the arrival of her nephew, Vinton Harper and his children, Vinton "Buzz" Harper, Jr. and Sonja Harper. She was a reporter for one of Raytown's newspapers, The Bugle. She was also a budding author, and had her own writing studio, which had been yanked from her by Thelma who needed the room for Sonja. (The room had originally belonged to Ellen Harper and Eunice Harper Higgins, Vinton's older sisters.)

At times, Fran had felt that her privacy had been invaded because of Vint and his family moving in, namely because Sonja had read her manuscript. Another particular cross was that she had to share a bathroom with the kids. At least Buzz kept his things in an orderly fashion and for this won favor from Fran, while Sonja was more messy and unorganized and therefore more frustrating to Fran.

Fran often stood up to her opinionated sister, although at times she would let her hair down and have some fun. She showed this side of herself when she indulged in some wine at the wedding preparations for Vint and Naomi Oates. Also, when she chaperoned Sonja's slumber party when Thelma was out of town.

However, after two seasons, due in large part to Rue McClanahan being unhappy in the role and moving on to The Golden Girls after the NBC run of Mama's Family ended, Fran was killed off by having her choke on a toothpick in the ladies room at the local bar and grill, The Bigger Jigger. Her room eventually went to her great-nephew, Bubba Higgins, which caused Vint and Naomi great consternation, since they had been angling for that room.

Frances Crowley's Last Will and Testament
After Fran's funeral in "Farewell Frannie", it was later revealed in "Where There's a Will" that she left a last will and testament and Thelma contacted the executor of Fran's last will and testament, Larwin P. Finstadler. According to Finstadler, Aunt Fran was worth an estimated $35,000 through six bank accounts, stock and land holdings.
 10% of her estate is set aside for her favorite charity, the Ray of Hope Home for Wayward Girls. ($3,500)
 To her sister Thelma Harper, she is bequeathed half of the remainder of her estate. ($15,750)
 To her nephew Vint Harper and niece-in-law Naomi Harper, they are bequeathed half of the remainder of her estate. ($15,750)
There is one stipulation that Thelma must fill out Fran's one final wish: which is to not lose her temper for a period of 2 weeks. If she failed, which she did, the entire estate would go to the Ray of Hope Home for Wayward Girls. Thelma failed to carry out this wish at the last minute, and she lost the bequest.

Iola Boylen

Iola Lucille Boylen, a character on Mama's Family, was played by Beverly Archer during the series' syndicated run (1986-1990).

During the NBC years (1983-1984), there was no mention of Iola by name; however, various references to the Boylen family were made, including a "Tommy Boylen" and "Ms. Boylen," the latter appearing briefly as a neighbor living across the street from Thelma Harper and her family.  After Iola's introduction in season three, she was portrayed as having lived across the street from and knowing the Harper family for all of her life (she was born in Raytown on July 7).  With the exception of her niece Vernette (Penelope Sudrow), the rest of her family members and the inside of her home were unseen.  References were made throughout the series to her father and morbidly obese and disabled mother, Mr. and Mrs. Boylen; her brother Verne; and her cousin Vernelia, who worked at an adoption agency in the neighboring town of Hinckley. Thelma's daughter Ellen had limited interaction with Iola in the syndicated version of the series, and through flashbacks, it is revealed that Thelma's daughter Eunice disliked her. Thelma's grandson Bubba always referred to her as "Miss Boylen," and Iola's catchphrase was a friendly "Knock, knock!" whenever she entered the Harpers' house, usually around dinnertime.

Iola would often be the only other person Thelma spent time with outside of her family. They would often be involved in civic work together, most notably the Church Ladies' League (CLL). Although the two women were best friends, multiple episodes and storylines would depict conflicts that would arise between the two when fighting over the same things (e.g., a position as president of the CLL; a rose-growing contest; a chili cook-off; a winning lottery ticket, etc.). When first introduced, the character of Iola seemed to be an antagonist for Mama, but this role was quickly dropped, and most episodes depicted Iola as a second banana to Thelma in her schemes throughout the series' run.

From the character's introduction at the beginning of season three until the middle of season four, the Iola character was infatuated with Vinton, a crush that was revealed to have existed since they were children. Her open flirtatiousness around Vinton and her disdain of Naomi led to an acrimonious and somewhat formal relationship between the two women. However, after a season four episode ("I Do, I Don't") in which various characters fantasized about married life with the objects of their affections, Iola's attitude towards Vinton changed from that point forward in the series. With Iola no longer displaying any overt interest in Vinton, relations between her and Naomi greatly improved. Episodes in seasons five and six depicted the two women spending time together at the theater and the mall, and also supporting each other (with Iola aiding Naomi when she was being sexually harassed by her boss in "Naomi's New Position," and Naomi helping organize a search party for Iola's missing mother in "The Big Nap").

Iola was depicted as mobile, having the ability to drive a car and the church van, neither of which was ever seen. As a home-economics major, she was frequently portrayed as an excellent cook, baker, gardener, housekeeper, and sewer of clothes, drapes, and slipcovers. However, she was also a frequent maker of handicrafts that ranged from the impractical to the ridiculous; she would bestow these unwanted items regularly upon the Harper family, much to their chagrin. It was never explained if Iola ever had a job outside of her house, or if she was a full-time caregiver for her parents; in several episodes, Iola alluded to selling her handicrafts at events, and one episode had her almost getting a job as an inventor.

In every episode in which Iola appeared, her character wore pink gingham shirtwaist dresses. However, depending on the plot lines, she would also change from her everyday dress into pink overalls (when working in the garden), black gingham shirtwaist dresses (while in mourning for characters who had died, including her cat), and during dream sequences, a pink off-the-shoulder dress (in the style of Naomi) and a vixen dress (in film-noir femme-fatale style).

Lloyd Meechum

Rev. Lloyd Meechum was played by Earl Boen.

Lloyd Meechum is the reverend for the unnamed church Thelma Harper and her family attend. He is married to the often overbearing Alberta Meechum and has a grandson named Eugene. Reverend Meechum officiated at the wedding of Vinton "Vint" Harper and Naomi Harper as well as at Fran Crowley's funeral.

An incident with Eugene that warranted him the most time on the show. One Sunday in church, Eugene carved initials into the pews; and ran up and down, screaming and throwing paper airplanes at the choir. While the Harpers' behavior wasn't sterling, Mrs. Meechum was not willing to control Eugene's behavior. Then, while the Meechums were visiting shut-ins, the Harpers were saddled with Eugene.

Eugene doctored Thelma's stew with a bottle of hot sauce; locked Vint and his nephew, Bubba Higgins in the garage; and tormented Naomi, Thelma and Iola. There was no respite for the Harpers, since Lloyd was injured in the hospital.

Eugene tied up Thelma, and it took Lloyd and Alberta to untie the thoroughly livid Thelma. Eugene then refused to leave, going as far as to kick Lloyd's hurt leg. Both Thelma and Lloyd at that point had enough of Eugene's shenanigans, and Thelma held Eugene down, while Lloyd spanked him for kicking his sore leg, as Alberta helplessly watched.

Alberta Meechum
Alberta Meechum was played by Anne Haney.

Alberta is the catty, judgmental, and gossipy wife of the Reverend Lloyd Meechum. As a church leader, she was well known in her parish. She was a former president of the Church Ladies League, or the CLL. She was also stuck-up by virtue of her strong position in the church. This allowed her to somewhat control her husband. Because of her nature, she was considered Thelma Harper's nemesis.

When Thelma made an attempt at an unprecedented second term as president of the Church Ladies League, the conniving Alberta, presumably in retaliation for Thelma helping her husband punish their grandson, did everything in her power to stop her, by putting up Iola as a candidate, and nearly destroying Thelma and Iola's friendship. As it turned out, neither of them won, both defeated by Lolly Perdue, the only member of the CLL big enough to separate the two squabbling combatants.

Alvin Tutweiler
Alvin Tutweiler is a fictional character in the television series Mama's Family. He was played by Alan Oppenheimer.

Tutweiler was the mayor of the fictitious community of Raytown, where Thelma Harper lived for many years. Despite his often pompous ways and tendency to rub his constituents the wrong way, he was a somewhat decent mayor.

He had met Ellen Harper not long after she had divorced her husband, Bruce Jackson, and the two bonded. To the snobbish and very conniving Ellen, she saw him as a step to becoming possibly the first lady of the state. Her claim to this was "it worked for Nancy Reagan!"

As always, trouble began when, during a senior citizen's group meeting at Thelma's house, she challenged the usually unopposed Mayor in his next election. This was a shock to Ellen, who refused to have any part of it, and fought her own family to try to stop it. Obviously, her heart was set for Alvin to win, but in the end, despite Ellen's machinations, Thelma defeated him by a shocking landslide.

However, she discovered that campaigning for mayor, and actually running a city are two very different things, and Thelma realized that she couldn't run Raytown, so she resigned and handed the reins of the city back to Alvin, who remained mayor all during the rest of the show's run.

Another time where the mayor made things tough for Thelma was when he was about to demolish the neighborhood, she lived in to put in another landfill. Making Raytown distinguished by having two landfills! However, her neighborhood (and her house in particular) was a former house of ill-repute where the founder of Raytown, James A. Ray, had died. It was located at Number One Old Decatur Road, and although the street system had changed, the house that she lived in was purchased back when it was Number One Old Decatur Road, and so the house was saved, to Tutweiler's chagrin, by making it a historical landmark. The neighbors were furious about this because they were hoping for a ton of money, and also to be rid of Thelma as a neighbor.

References

 
Mama's Family